Commandant Rivière was one of a dozen s built for the French Navy in the first decade of the 20th century.

Design and description
The Bouclier class were designed to a general specification and varied significantly from each other in various ways. Designed to displace , they displaced  at normal load. Their crew numbered 80–83 men.

Commandant Rivière was powered by a pair of Breguet steam turbines, each driving one propeller shaft using steam provided by four water-tube boilers. Commandant Rivière handily exceed that speed, reaching  during her sea trials.

The primary armament of the Bouclier-class ships consisted of two  Modèle 1893 guns in single mounts, one each fore and aft of the superstructure, and four  Modèle 1902 guns distributed amidships. They were also fitted with two twin mounts for  torpedo tubes amidships.

Construction and career
Commandant Rivière was ordered from Forges et Chantiers de la Gironde and was launched from its Bordeaux shipyard on 2 October 1912. The ship was completed the following year.

References

Bibliography

 

Bouclier-class destroyers
Ships built in France
1912 ships